"Love Crime" is a song by Siouxsie. Her first release in eight years, it was featured in the finale of the TV series Hannibal, broadcast in August 2015.

Background
Series creator Bryan Fuller, who had contacted her in November 2014, described the song (composed by Siouxsie with Brian Reitzell) as "epic". Reitzell had previously worked for Siouxsie in 2006 for the Marie Antoinette soundtrack when he re-orchestrated the introduction of Siouxsie and the Banshees's debut single "Hong Kong Garden" with strings players for Sofia Coppola's film.

On recording the song, Siouxsie has stated:

Releases
The song was made available for digital download on 4 December 2015, titled as "Love Crime (Amuse-Bouche Version)".

"Love Crime" (retitled "Love Crime from the Wrath of the Lamb") was included on Hannibal Season 3 – Volume 2 (Original Television Soundtrack), which was issued by Lakeshore Records in digital format on 11 December 2015, and on CD in January 2016. A double vinyl edition, was issued by Invada Records on 27 May 2016 on black vinyl, and blue vinyl (the latter being only available on the label website).

The song became available for streaming in 2022.

Track listing

Digital download
 "Love Crime (Amuse-Bouche Version)" — 4:59

References 

2015 singles
Siouxsie Sioux songs
2015 songs
Songs written by Siouxsie Sioux
Hannibal (TV series)